Robert Rogers,  (March 2, 1864 – July 21, 1936) was a Canadian merchant and politician.  He served as a cabinet minister at the federal and provincial levels.

Rogers was born in Lakefield, Canada East (now Quebec), the son of Lieutenant-Colonel George Rogers. He was educated in Lachute, Berthier and Montreal, and later moved to Winnipeg, Manitoba to become director of the Monarch Life Assurance Company.  In religion, he was a member of the Church of England.

Manitoba politics 
He contested Lisgar in the 1896 federal election as a candidate of the federal Conservative Party, and lost to Liberal Robert Lorne Richardson by fifty-four votes. He was 32 years old.

Rogers was elected to the Legislative Assembly of Manitoba in the 1899 provincial election as a Conservative candidate, defeating Liberal candidate J.L. Brown by twenty-eight votes in Manitou.  The Conservatives won this election, and Rogers sat in the legislature as a backbench supporter of Hugh John Macdonald's administration.  When Rodmond Roblin succeeded Macdonald as premier on October 29, 1900, he appointed Rogers as a minister without portfolio.

On December 20, 1900, Rogers was promoted to the powerful position of Minister of Public Works.  He remained in this position for eleven years, and was often regarded as the second most powerful figure in Roblin's cabinet, helping the premier construct an effective patronage network.  He was re-elected without difficulty in the campaigns of 1903, 1907 and 1910.

Federal politics 
Rogers turned to federal politics in 1911.  The federal Conservative Party under Robert Borden defeated Wilfrid Laurier's governing Liberals in the 1911 federal election, due in part to assistance from Roblin's electoral machine in Manitoba.  Although Rogers was not a candidate in the election, he was appointed as Canada's Minister of the Interior and Superintendent-General of Indian Affairs on October 10, 1911.  Seventeen days later, he was acclaimed to the House of Commons in a by-election for Winnipeg.

Rogers was given additional responsibilities as Minister of Mines on March 30, 1912.  On October 29, 1912, he left his other portfolios to become Canada's Minister of Public Works, a position which he held for five years.  He did not seek re-election in 1917.

He attempted to return to the House of Commons for Lisgar in the 1921 election, but lost to Progressive candidate John Livingstone Brown by 1,164 votes.

Rogers was returned to parliament in the 1925 election, defeating former Liberal premier Tobias Norris by 1,617 votes in Winnipeg South.  In the following year's election, he lost his seat to Liberal John Stewart McDiarmid by 1,171 votes.

He was a candidate at the Conservative Party leadership convention in 1927. He finished fifth out of six candidates. His vote mostly vanished in the second vote - the leader was elected through run-off voting. His lack of French ended his drive for the leadership.

Rogers won election to the House of Commons for a third time in the 1930 election, defeating McDiarmid by 343 votes.  He was not included in the cabinet of Conservative prime minister Richard Bennett, and retired from politics in 1935.

He lost his fortune in the Great Depression. He died in 1936 in a sanatorium. His palatial home where he had entertained so lavishly, was torn down. His wife died a sad death

References

External links
 

1864 births
1936 deaths
Conservative Party of Canada (1867–1942) MPs
Progressive Conservative Party of Manitoba MLAs
People from Pembina Valley Region, Manitoba
Members of the House of Commons of Canada from Manitoba
Members of the King's Privy Council for Canada
Members of the Executive Council of Manitoba